Dan'l Webster may refer to:
Daniel Webster, a United States Senator and Secretary of State;
Dan'l Webster (train), a named train that used to run between New York City and Boston;
Dan'l Webster, the name of a fictional frog featured in Mark Twain's short story The Celebrated Jumping Frog of Calaveras County.